Gladys "Patsy" Pulitzer Preston (May 31, 1928 – October 28, 2011) was an American fashion model, socialite and philanthropist. The granddaughter of Joseph Pulitzer, newspaper publisher and founder of the Pulitzer Prize, she grew up in Palm Beach, Florida. In 1961, she appeared in Sports Illustrated as one of the "World's Loveliest Sportswomen", after catching a  black marlin, a then world-record catch for a woman. She modeled and appeared in various magazines. In later life, she was active in women's rights causes, particularly Planned Parenthood.

Early life
Gladys Pulitzer was born in New York City on May 31, 1928, the daughter of Gladys Mildred Munn and Herbert "Tony" Pulitzer, and a granddaughter of Joseph Pulitzer, newspaper publisher and founder of the Pulitzer Prize. She grew up in Palm Beach, Florida. Pulitzer was educated at Palm Beach Day School and the Foxcroft School, Middleburg, Virginia, and earned an associate of arts degree from Finch College, New York. Her brother Herbert Pulitzer was married to the fashion designer Lilly Pulitzer, and Roxanne Pulitzer.

Career
In 1961, she appeared in Sports Illustrated as one of the "World's Loveliest Sportswomen", after catching  black marlin fish off Cabo Blanco, Peru, a then world-record fish for a woman (Sports Illustrated began publication in 1954.).

She was a model for the Ford Modeling Agency. In 1953 and 1955, she was photographed by Slim Aarons. In 1961, she was photographed by Frances McLaughlin-Gill for Sports Illustrated in Palm Beach, Florida, wearing clothes from Lilly Pulitzer Fashions, her sister-in-law's brand.

In later life, she was active in women's rights causes, particularly Planned Parenthood.

Personal life
On June 27, 1949, she married investment broker David Frost Bartlett (1924–1997), brother of Charles L. Bartlett, at the family's estate in Oyster Bay, New York. They later divorced. In 1964, he married Stefane Abeille Demay. 

In 1959, she married Lewis Thompson Preston (1926–1995), chairman of J.P. Morgan & Co. and president of the World Bank. 
They lived in Washington, D.C., and Palm Beach, Florida.

She had four daughters, Linda B. Miller of Palm Beach, Victoria B. Donaldson of Yorktown, New York, Priscilla P. Hallowell of Katonah, New York, and Electra P. Toub of New York City.

She died in New York City on October 28, 2011. She lived there at 580 Park Avenue, and her three-bedroom apartment sold in April 2012 for $5.8 million to Edward Shugrue III and his wife Greta.

References

External links
Patsy Pulitzer at Find a Grave

American female models
2011 deaths
1928 births
Foxcroft School alumni
Finch College alumni
American socialites
Pulitzer family (newspapers)
Models from New York City
Female models from New York (state)
Burials at Locust Valley Cemetery
People from Palm Beach, Florida
American fishers
American women's rights activists
Ford Models models